Albert Rose may refer to:

 Albert Rose (physicist) (1910–1990), American physicist
 Albert Rose (athlete) (1901–1961), American track and field athlete
 Albert Rose (wrestler)
 Alby Rose (1875–1921), Australian rules footballer

See also 
Bert Rose, football executive
 Albert Rose-Innes, cricketer
 Albert Rosen, conductor
 Albert Ross (disambiguation)